Sikri  is a village in Phagwara Tehsil in Kapurthala district of Punjab State, India. Most of the families belongs to Sikh Rajput community. The village is administrated by a Sarpanch Mrs. Gurdeep Kaur at present.who is an elected representative of village.
Other Members of panchayat are 
Kewal Singh,
Rajinder Singh,
Balvir Singh,
Manjit Kaur,
Resham Kaur.

Transport 
Phagwara Junction Railway Station and Mauli Halt Railway Station are the nearby railway stations to Sikri, while Jalandhar City Railway station is 23 km away from the village. The village is 118 km away from Sri Guru Ram Dass Jee International Airport in Amritsar and the other nearest airport is Sahnewal Airport in Ludhiana which is located 40 km away from the village.

References

External links
 Kapurthala Villages List

Villages in Kapurthala district